High Treason is a 1951 British spy thriller. It is a sequel to the film Seven Days to Noon (1950) from the same team. Director Roy Boulting, co-director (with his brother John) and co-writer of the first film also directed and co-wrote this one. Frank Harvey, Boulting's co-writer, was also a co-writer of the earlier film.  André Morell reprises his role as Detective Superintendent Folland of Scotland Yard's Special Branch from the first film, though in High Treason he is subordinate to the head of Special Branch, Commander Robert "Robbie" Brennan, played by Liam Redmond.

Plot
Enemy saboteurs infiltrate the industrial suburbs of London, intending to disable three power stations in London and five other stations elsewhere, all strategically located throughout the UK. Their motive is to cripple the British economy and to enable subversive forces to insinuate themselves into government. The saboteurs are thwarted, not by counterintelligence agents, but by workaday London police officers, and finally by a repentant betrayer from their own ranks.

Cast

Liam Redmond as Commander Robert Brennan
André Morell as Superintendent Folland
Anthony Bushell as Major Elliott
Kenneth Griffith as Jimmy Ellis (Soviet agent)
Patric Doonan as George Ellis
Joan Hickson as Mrs Ellis
Anthony Nicholls as Sir Grant Mansfield, M.P. (Head Soviet agent, and putative Prime Minister after the incumbent government's overthrow)
Mary Morris as Anna Braun (Soviet agent)
Geoffrey Keen as Morgan Williams (Soviet agent)
Stuart Lindsell as Commissioner
John Bailey as Stringer
Dora Bryan as Mrs Bowers
Charles Lloyd-Pack as Percy Ward
Laurence Naismith as Reginald Gordon-Wells
Michael Ward as Music Club Member (uncredited)
Dandy Nichols as Doorstep Cleaner (uncredited)
Alfie Bass as Albert Brewer (uncredited)
Jean Anderson as woman in street (uncredited)
Glyn Houston as railway shunter (uncredited)
Peter Jones announcer at music club (uncredited)
Moultrie Kelsall as ship's captain (uncredited)
Howard Lang as policeman who discovered Jimmy's body (uncredited)
Harry Locke as Andy, the telephone engineer (uncredited)
Victor Maddern as anarchist (uncredited)
Tony Quinn as chemistry lecturer (uncredited)
Marianne Stone as Alfie's mother (uncredited)
Bruce Seton (uncredited)

Critical reception
An unnamed New York Times reviewer commented, "it is worthy to note that High Treason travels at a more leisurely pace than Seven Days, but Roy Boulting, who also directed, achieves an equally intelligent handling of the many pieces needed to fit his intricate jigsaw of a plot," and remarked that, "deft direction, crisp dialogue and a generally excellent cast gives High Treason a high polish," concluding that the film is "a taut tale and a pleasure".

In 2013, a contributor to Cageyfilms.com wrote, "although the politics of High Treason are as dated as those of Leo McCarey's My Son John (1952), the location shooting in London and the character details around the periphery of the narrative provide a fascinating documentary portrait of the metropolis just a few years after the war and, as in Sam Fuller's Pickup on South Street, the ostensible political element can be seen as little more than a MacGuffin on which to hang the narrative. And speaking of MacGuffins, the film has several very well-developed Hitchcockian elements, particularly the pretentious modern music society which serves as a front for the communist plotters and the labyrinthine building which doubles as a tutorial college and secret commie headquarters".

References

External links
 

1951 films
1951 crime drama films
1950s spy thriller films
British crime drama films
British spy films
Cold War spy films
Films about terrorism
Films directed by Roy Boulting
Films scored by John Addison
Films shot at Pinewood Studios
Films set in London
British black-and-white films
Films produced by Paul Soskin
1950s English-language films
1950s British films